Climate change in Scotland is causing a range of impacts on Scotland, and its mitigation and adaptation is a matter for the devolved Scottish Parliament. Climate change has already changed timings of spring events such as leaf unfolding, bird migration and egg-laying. Severe effects are likely to occur on biodiversity.

Greenhouse gas emissions 

Scotland's greenhouse gas emissions only accounted for 10% of the UK's emissions in 2003, when figures were published. 37% of Scottish emissions are in energy supply and 17% in transport. Between 1990 and 2007, Scottish net emissions have reduced by 18.7%. The industrial processes sector had the largest decrease, of 72% with a reduction of 48% in the public sector trailing closely behind.

Impacts on the natural environment

Temperature and weather changes 
In Scotland, the effects of climate change can be seen in raised temperature changes, increased rainfall and less snow cover. These changes have a significant impact on the growing, breeding and migration seasons, as well as species abundance and diversity.

Ecosystems 
Past observations have indicated some of the likely effects of climate change on biodiversity. Climate change has already changed timings of spring events such as leaf unfolding, bird migration and egg-laying. The population of species could change due to the speed at which they adapt.

Changes in the ranges of plant and animal species have been observed. New species may move to Scotland with the changing climate. Shifts may occur on hillsides and species that are already confined to high mountains may become extinct in Scotland.

Severe effects are likely to occur on biodiversity. Species of plants and animals that can't adapt quickly enough may become extinct or be replaced by other creatures. Coastal habitats, including machairs, may disappear due to high sea levels eroding the land. Salmon spawning beds may be wiped out by flash floods causing population problems for the species. There will be new risks to animals, plants and their habitats, including non-native pests and diseases.

When all these effects are combined with human response, such as land use change and the growth of new forests, Scotland's ecosystems could change drastically.

Impacts on people

Economic impacts

Agriculture 
In some cases, Scottish agriculture may experience a positive change as summers will be warmer and drier. A higher yields and the possibility of new crops being able to grow in Scotland.  However, soil quality would lower with heat and soil moisture stress. The availability of fresh water could cause problems for livestock. Heat stress With warmer and wetter conditions, livestock could face new diseases such as West Nile virus and outbreaks of bluetongue or parasites could increase.

Mitigation and adaptation

Policies and regulation

Climate Change Act 

The Climate Change (Scotland) Act 2009 is an Act passed by the Scottish Parliament. The Act includes an emissions target, set for the year 2050, for a reduction of at least 80% from the baseline year, 1990. Annual targets for greenhouse gas emissions must also be set, after consultation the relevant advisory bodies. Provisions are included in the Act for the creation of the Scottish Committee on Climate Change, as at present the only advisory body is the UK Committee on Climate Change. Ministers in parliament must now report on the progress of these targets. As of January 2011, public sector bodies in Scotland must comply with new guidelines set out by the Scottish Government.

Protection and enforcement

The Scottish Environment Protection Agency (SEPA) is Scotland's environmental regulator. SEPA's main role is in protecting and improving Scotland's natural environment.  SEPA does this by helping communities, businesses and industries understand their legal and moral responsibilities they have relating to the environment.

SEPA recognises that climate change is the single greatest threat to our future. The organisation has produced its own climate change plan which contains details about how it will reduce its carbon emissions. This five year climate change plan introduces SEPA's specific role in climate change mitigation. SEPA, Scottish Natural Heritage (SNH), Forestry and Land Scotland (FLS), Scottish Forestry and Historic Environment Scotland are all government funded organisations with responsibilities for different aspects of Scotland's environment and heritage. A joint statement on climate change was created by all partners in 2009.

"The Scientific evidence is now overwhelming: climate change presents very serious global risks and it demands an urgent global response".

Afforestation

Energy

International cooperation 

During a 2017 visit to the United States, the first minister Nicola Sturgeon met Jerry Brown, Governor of California, where both signed an agreement committing both the Government of California and the Scottish Government to work together to tackle climate change.

The COP26 climate conference was held in Glasgow in 2021.

See also

 Energy policy of Scotland
 Sustainable development in Scotland
 Climate change in the United Kingdom
 David Reay, a climate change scientist, author, and senior lecturer in carbon management at the University of Edinburgh

References

External links 
 Cairngorms Climate An investigation of climate change in the Scottish highlands.
 Scottish Environment Protection Agency
 Climate Change from the UCB Libraries GovPubs
 Climate Change from the Met Office (UK)
 Global Climate Change from NASA (US)
 SNIFFER: A handbook of climate trends across Scotland

 
Scotland